Seth Lance Winston (August 15, 1950 – June 5, 2015) was an American filmmaker best known for his short film Session Man.

Born in Philadelphia and raised in Los Angeles, Winston received a Bachelor of Arts in cinema production from the USC School of Cinematic Arts.

He was selected by the Academy of Motion Picture Arts and Sciences for their director's internship program, giving him the opportunity to work on Steven Spielberg's science fiction film Close Encounters of the Third Kind. He went on to write for several TV and cinematic movies, including She's Out of Control, starring Tony Danza.

Winston won the Academy Award for Best Live Action Short along with Rob Fried in 1992 for Session Man. He taught at the USC School of Cinematic Arts, UC Santa Barbara and Columbia College Hollywood.

Winston died at his home in Woodland Hills from an apparent heart attack on June 5, 2015, aged 64.

Director and writer Kim Nguyen dedicated his movie Two Lovers and a Bear (2016) in memory of Seth.

References

External links 
Seth Winston at the Internet Movie Database.

1950 births
2015 deaths
American filmmakers
Screenwriters from Pennsylvania
Artists from Philadelphia
Directors of Live Action Short Film Academy Award winners
USC School of Cinematic Arts alumni